The 2011 Samarkand Challenger was a professional tennis tournament played on clay courts. It was the 15th edition of the tournament which was part of the 2011 ATP Challenger Tour. It took place in Samarkand, Uzbekistan between 8 and 14 August 2011.

ATP entrants

Seeds

 1 Rankings are as of August 1, 2011.

Other entrants
The following players received wildcards into the singles main draw:
  Murad Inoyatov
  Denis Istomin
  Christopher Rungkat
  Nigmat Shofayziev

The following players received entry from the qualifying draw:
  Sarvar Ikramov
  Temur Ismailov
  Alexander Kudryavtsev
  Divij Sharan

The following players received entry from the qualifying draw as a lucky loser:
  Jakhongir Jalalov
  Vaja Uzakov

Champions

Singles

 Denis Istomin def.  Malek Jaziri, 7–6(7–2), ret.

Doubles

 Michail Elgin /  Alexander Kudryavtsev def.  Radu Albot /  Andrey Kuznetsov, 7–6(7–4), 2–6, [10–7]

External links
Official Website
ITF Search
ATP official site

Samarkand Challenger
Samarkand Challenger
2011 in Uzbekistani sport
August 2011 sports events in Asia